Paralikkunnu is a small village near Kambalakkad in Kaniyambetta and Muttil Panchayath, Wayanad district, Kerala, India.

Paralikkunnu Juma Masjid, situated in the heart of the village, is one of the most important juma masjids in Wayanad district. It is under  Samastha Kerala Jamiyyathul Ulama.

Paralikkunnu also has Saint Sebastian Church and a primary school ( WOLP school ).
Paralikkunnu is a famous village in wayanad.Paralikkunnu mini ground is famous for fives football.

References 

Villages in Wayanad district